Praga Rugby is a Czech rugby club based in Prague.
They currently play in the KB Extraliga and are considered to be one of the strongest teams in the Czech Republic.

History
The club was founded in 1944.

Honours
 Czechoslovak Championships
 1948, 1955, 1960, 1962, 1963, 1966, 1972, 1982, 1983, 1984, 1986, 1987, 1988, 1992, 2002, 2014, 2015
 KB Extraliga
 2002
 2010 (sevens)
 2011 (sevens)

Former names

 1944-45 Radostně Vpřed
 1945-48 LTC Praha
 1949-50 TJ Textilia Praha (Tělovýchovná jednota Textilia Praha)
 1951–52 TJ Sokol Autopraga (Tělovýchovná jednota Sokol Autopraga)
 1953–67 TJ Spartak AZKG Praha
 1968–2006 TJ Praga Praha (Tělovýchovná jednota Praga Praha)
 2007– RC Praga Praha

Current squad

Team Management
 Head Coach: Roman Šuster
 Rugby Coaches: Pavel Šťastný, Michal Kinter
 Athletic Coach: Václav Pokorný
 Physio: Michal Přibyl, Filip Strakoš

External links
  Praga Rugby

Czech rugby union teams
Sport in Prague
Rugby clubs established in 1944